The Ale Water is a tributary of the River Teviot, in the Scottish Borders area of Scotland. It rises at Henwoodie Hill and flows through Alemoor Loch.
It meets the Teviot south of the village of Ancrum, and it runs through Ashkirk and Lilliesleaf.

The river's name was originally "Alne", as in Alnwick.

See also
List of places in the Scottish Borders
List of rivers of Scotland

References

External links
SCRAN Image: The Ale Water
RCAHMS record of Ale Water - Railway Viaduct, Ancrum
RCAHMS/Canmore record of Milrighall / Roman Camp at Ale Water
Gazetteer for Scotland: Map of Ale Water
SEPA (Scottish Environment Protection Agency - River Level Data: Ale Water at Ancrum
Environment Agency: Ale Water at Ancrum

Rivers of the Scottish Borders
2Ale